Edgardo Guilbe Alomar (born 18 March 1966 in Ponce, Puerto Rico) is a Puerto Rican former sprinter who specialized in the 200 metres. His personal best time was 20.53 seconds, achieved in July 1989 in San Juan.

He won the gold medal at the 1989 Central American and Caribbean Championships and silver medals at the 1990 Central American and Caribbean Games and the 1993 Central American and Caribbean Championships. He also competed at the 1988 Olympic Games and the 1993 World Championships without reaching the final.

In 2018, Edgardo Guilbe was credited with running a 21.95 200 meters and a 49.68 400 meters (even though he had not previously had a history of running this event).  Those marks would have been significant improvements on Masters world records for a 52-year-old man.  Subsequently, it has been discovered those marks were produced by Edgardo Guilbe Correa, his son.

International competitions

References

External links

Sports Reference profile
 100 meters Mejores Marcas Edgardo Guilbe 2010 

1966 births
Living people
Sportspeople from Ponce, Puerto Rico
Puerto Rican male sprinters
Olympic track and field athletes of Puerto Rico
Athletes (track and field) at the 1988 Summer Olympics
Athletes (track and field) at the 1992 Summer Olympics
Athletes (track and field) at the 1987 Pan American Games
Athletes (track and field) at the 1991 Pan American Games
World Athletics Championships athletes for Puerto Rico
Universiade medalists in athletics (track and field)
Central American and Caribbean Games silver medalists for Puerto Rico
Competitors at the 1986 Central American and Caribbean Games
Competitors at the 1990 Central American and Caribbean Games
Universiade medalists for Puerto Rico
Central American and Caribbean Games medalists in athletics
Medalists at the 1987 Summer Universiade
Pan American Games competitors for Puerto Rico